Victor Străistari (born 21 June 1999) is a Moldovan professional footballer who plays as a goalkeeper for Moldovan Super Liga club CSF Bălți.

Club career
Străistari started playing football for Real Succes Chișinău before joining the Sheriff Tiraspol academy. He made his professional debut as part of Petrocub Hîncești on 10 November 2018, starting in a 1–0 away loss to Dinamo-Auto.

In 2019, Străistari moved to Dinamo-Auto where he experienced his breakthrough. He made 34 appearances through two seasons, including his European debut on 27 August 2020 in a 2–1 away loss to Ventspils in a UEFA Europa League qualifier.

Străistari joined Romanian Liga II club Dunărea Călărași on 21 July 2021, signing a one-year contract. One month later, however, he returned to Moldova, signing with CSF Bălți on 28 August 2021. He made his debut for the club on 11 September in a 1–1 away draw against Milsami.

International career
Străistari is a Moldovan youth international, and has gained a combined 13 caps for Moldova under-19 and under-21. He made his debut at under-21 level on 11 October 2019 in a 2–1 win over Wales.

Career statistics

References

External links
 Victor Străistari at CSF Bălți

1999 births
Living people
Moldovan footballers
Moldova youth international footballers
Moldova under-21 international footballers
FC Dinamo-Auto Tiraspol players
CS Petrocub Hîncești players
Moldovan Super Liga players
Association football goalkeepers
Real Succes Chișinău players
FC Dunărea Călărași players
CSF Bălți players
Moldovan expatriate footballers
Moldovan expatriate sportspeople in Romania
Expatriate footballers in Romania
People from Criuleni District